Daba is a town under the administration of Qingtongxia, Ningxia, China. , it administers Dianchang Residential Neighborhood and the following 15 villages:
Daba Village
Weiqiao Village
Shamiao Village
Limin Village
Chenjun Village
Jiangdong Village
Jiangnan Village
Xinqiao Village
Lixin Village
Sankeshu Village
Huashigou Village
Wanglaotan Village
Shangtan Village
Zhongzhuang Village
Zhongtan Village

References 

Township-level divisions of Ningxia
Qingtongxia